The evacuation of Pakistani citizens was a civil-military combined effort by Pakistan to extract and evacuate overseas Pakistanis from war-torn areas of Yemen.

According to Ministry of Human Resource Development of Pakistan, there were ~3,000 overseas Pakistanis residing in Yemen prior to the Saudi Arabian-led military intervention in Yemen. In response to the Yemeni crises, the Pakistan government authorized the Pakistan International Airlines to launch of the special flights for aerial evacuation while the Pakistan Navy evacuated the remaining stranded Pakistanis with two frigates.

Besides the evacuation of overseas Pakistanis, citizens of China and the United Kingdom among other countries were also evacuated by Pakistan. Approximately, ~1,800 Pakistan's citizens were extracted from Yemen and safely returned to Pakistan, before the conflict escalated.

Background

On 26 March 2015, the Saudi Arabian Ambassador to the United States, Adel al-Jubeir, announced the Saudi Arabia and the Gulf Cooperation Council launched a military operation against Shiite Houthi rebels in Yemen. This was preceded by weeks of turmoil during which the Houthi guerrillas toppled the government of President Abd Rabbuh Mansur Hadi and took over the large parts of the country.

The Foreign Office had earlier instructed the Pakistani community to leave Yemen as the situation on ground could worsen. However, 3000 Pakistani citizens had not heeded the warnings and were trapped in Yemen. The overseas Pakistanis began reaching out the country's news media, notably Geo News, ARY News, and Express News, appealing the government for a safe evacuation on 27 March. The Pakistan Embassy in Yemen worked towards moving the Pakistani community from Aden to Sana'a; around 150 to 200 Pakistani citizens were still reportedly trapped in Aden. The Pakistan Navy deployed the PNS Aslat missile frigate as well as special aerial missions by PIA were flown in Yemen. On March 29, 2015, the PIA flights evacuated ~503 Pakistani citizens from al-Hudaydah to Karachi.

Naval warship deployment

The Pakistan Navy had deployed two Zulfiquar-class frigates for the evacuation: the PNS Shamsheer and PNS Aslat.

See also
Operation Raahat

References

Pakistan–Yemen relations
2015 in Pakistan
Non-combat military operations involving Pakistan
Naval operations involving Pakistan
Humanitarian military operations
Airlifts
History of the foreign relations of Pakistan
Pakistan International Airlines
Yemeni Civil War (2014–present)
Non-combatant evacuation operations